Ladies' Day is a 1943 American comedy film directed by Leslie Goodwins and written by Charles E. Roberts and Dane Lussier, adapted from the play of the same name. The film stars Lupe Vélez, Eddie Albert, Patsy Kelly, Max Baer and Jerome Cowan. It was released on April 9, 1943, by RKO Pictures.

Plot
Wives and girlfriends sit together at a Sox game to watch Wacky Waters (Eddie Albert) pitch. He's a fun-loving guy who is delighted to learn that Hollywood star Pepita Zorita (Lupe Velez) is at today's game, selling kisses for charity. Wacky promptly borrows money from team publicity man Updyke (Jerome Cowan) to buy $300 worth.

In the grandstand, catcher Hippo (Max Baer) Jones's wife Hazel (Patsy Kelly) and the other women are concerned. Wacky is the best pitcher in baseball when he concentrates on what he's doing, but whenever a pretty girl turns his head, a distracted Wacky suddenly can't throw the ball over the plate. The wives want the Sox to be in the World Series so their husbands will receive bonus money.

Sure enough, Wacky's infatuation with Pepita begins a run of bad luck for him and the Sox at the ballpark. On the train, the wives protest until Wacky discloses that he and Pepita secretly ran off to get married. While they are happy for the couple, Hazel schemes to have a Hollywood producer require Pepita's presence to shoot a movie there. This could keep Wacky focused on baseball until the World Series.

Pepita finishes the film faster than expected. She hurries to Kansas City to see Wacky and the Sox, so the wives take matters into their own hands, tying up Pepita in a hotel room against her will. Wacky eventually wins the World Series for the Sox, but this time, it's only because the woman he loves is there.

Cast 
 Lupe Vélez as Pepita Zorita
 Eddie Albert as Wacky Waters
 Patsy Kelly as Hazel Jones
 Max Baer as Hippo Jones
 Jerome Cowan as Updyke
 Iris Adrian as Kitty McClouen
 Joan Barclay as Joan Samuels
 Cliff Clark as Dan Hannigan
 Carmen Morales as Marianna D'Angelo 
 George Cleveland as Doc
 Jack Briggs as Marty Samuels
 Russ Clark as Smokey Lee
 Nedrick Young as Tony D'Angelo
 Eddie Dew as Spike McClouen
 Tom Kennedy as Dugan
 Ralph Sanford as First Umpire

References

External links 
 
 
 
 

1943 films
1940s sports comedy films
American baseball films
American black-and-white films
Films scored by Roy Webb
Films directed by Leslie Goodwins
RKO Pictures films
Films produced by Bert Gilroy
American sports comedy films
1943 comedy films
1940s English-language films
1940s American films